The Women's team time trial of the 2018 UCI Road World Championships was a cycling event that took place on 23 September 2018 in Innsbruck, Austria. It was the fifteenth edition of the championship, and the seventh since its reintroduction for trade teams in 2012. Dutch outfit  were the defending champions, having won in 2017. 12 teams and 72 riders entered the competition.

The bronze medal went to the defending world champions , 28.67 seconds behind .

Four of the five remaining riders won their first world title – Alena Amialiusik won her second gold medal – in a result described as a "surprise" by the cycling media, as it was the squad's first team time trial win of 2018.

Course
The race consisted of a route  in length, starting from Ötztal and ending in Innsbruck.

Final classification
All twelve teams completed the -long course.

References

External links
 Team time trial page at Innsbruck-Tirol 2018 website

Women's team time trial
UCI Road World Championships – Women's team time trial
2018 in women's road cycling
UCI